Ignacio Ygnatil Berriochoa (July 31, 1865 - May 17, 1949) was a skilled stonemason in Lincoln County, Idaho.  He was born in the Basque region of Spain and moved to Idaho in 1904.  He lived in Shoshone, Idaho from 1910 to 1949 where he was a farmer and sheepman.  A number of his works are listed on the U.S. National Register of Historic Places.

Works include:
Jose and Gertrude Anasola House, 120 N. Alta St. Shoshone, ID (Berriochoa, Ignacio), NRHP-listed
Galo Arambarri Boarding House, 109 N. Greenwood St. Shoshone, ID (Berriochoa, Ignacio), NRHP-listed
Ignacio Berriochoa Farm, NW of Dietrich Dietrich, ID (Berriochoa, Ignacio), NRHP-listed
J.C. Penney Company Building, 104 S. Rail St. Shoshone, ID (Berriochoa, Ignacio), NRHP-listed
Denton J. Paul Water Tank, E of Dietrich Dietrich, ID (Berriochoa, Ignacio), NRHP-listed
Manuel Silva Barn, E of Shoshone Shoshone, ID (Berriochoa, Ignacio), NRHP-listed

See also
Jack Oughton, a contemporary stonemason, also in Lincoln County
Bill Darrah, also in Lincoln County
H. T. Pugh, a contemporary stonemason in Jerome County

References

American people of Basque descent
American stonemasons
People from Shoshone, Idaho
1865 births
1949 deaths
Spanish emigrants to the United States